Children of Morta is an action role-playing video game with roguelike elements, released in September 2019. Developed by studio Dead Mage, it follows the story of the Bergson family, custodians of Mount Morta, who must defend it from an evil called the Corruption.

Gameplay
Players take on the role of members of the Bergson family, with additional family members being unlocked as a player progresses through the game, to a total of seven playable characters. Each family member has its own playstyle and gameplay mechanics and levels up as it is played, granting improvements to themselves and other family members. The player must traverse a number of procedurally generated dungeons within the caverns of Mount Morta to clear them of various enemies and bosses.

Individual runs of the dungeon are bookended with returns to the Bergson family home, which sometimes progresses the narrative or allows players to witness additional dialogue. Some parts of the story take place after events happening in the game.

Reception

Children of Morta was met with "generally favorable" reviews on all platforms, according to the review aggregator Metacritic.

References

External links
 

2019 video games
Action role-playing video games
MacOS games
Multiplayer and single-player video games
Multiplayer online games
Nintendo Switch games
PlayStation 4 games
Video games developed in Iran
Video games using procedural generation
Linux games
Windows games
Xbox Cloud Gaming games
Xbox One games
Games developed
Works by Iranian people
11 bit studios games
Dead Mage games